Senator Stapleton may refer to:

Corey Stapleton (born 1967), Montana State Senate
Patrick J. Stapleton Jr. (1924–2001), Pennsylvania State Senate